Lenny Martinez may refer to:
 Lenny Martinez (musician)
 Lenny Martinez (cyclist)